The 2013 Judo Grand Slam Baku was held in Baku, Azerbaijan, from 4 to 5 May 2013.

Medal summary

Men's events

Women's events

Source Results

Medal table

References

External links
 

2013 IJF World Tour
2013 Judo Grand Slam
Judo
Grand Slam Baku 2013
Judo
Judo